Joy Lynn White (born October 2, 1961) (also known as Joy White) is an American country music singer-songwriter. White was born in Bentonville, Arkansas but raised in Mishawaka, Indiana. Signed to Columbia Records in 1992, she released her debut album Between Midnight & Hindsight that same year. In 1993, she was nominated for Top New Female Vocalist at the Academy of Country Music Awards, along with Martina McBride and Michelle Wright, but lost to Wright. A critical favorite, reviewer Alanna Nash once described White as "a fiery redhead with a wild-and-wounded delivery and an attitude that says she’s not to be ignored." The Dixie Chicks covered both "Cold Day in July" from White's first album and "Tonight the Heartache's on Me" from her Wild Love album.

Discography

Albums

Singles

Music videos

References

External links
Joy Lynn White at CMT.com

Living people
American women country singers
American country singer-songwriters
Columbia Records artists
Mercury Records artists
Place of birth missing (living people)
1961 births
Singer-songwriters from Arkansas
People from Mishawaka, Indiana
Country musicians from Arkansas
Country musicians from Indiana
21st-century American women
Singer-songwriters from Indiana